Solimana is a  mountain in the Chila mountain range in the Andes of Peru. It is located in the Arequipa Region, Castilla Province, Chachas District. Solimana lies northwest of Huamanripayoc and north of Huayllayoc.

References

Mountains of Peru
Mountains of Arequipa Region